Schock 34 may refer to:

Schock 34 GP, racing sailboat
Schock 34 PC, cruising sailboat